Barreirosuchus is an extinct genus of trematochampsid notosuchian known from the Late Cretaceous of São Paulo State, southeastern Brazil. It contains a single species, Barreirosuchus franciscoi. It is most closely resembles Caririsuchus camposi from the Araripe Basin and Itasuchus jesuinoi also from the Bauru Basin, and shares with them several synapomorphies.

Discovery
Barreirosuchus is known only from the holotype specimen MPMA-04-0012/00, an undeformed posterior portion of the skull with six teeth and a series of four vertebrae, two dorsal and two sacral. It was found four kilometer from Monte Alto County, in the escarpment of the Serra do Jabuticabal, in the rural area of Monte Alto, São Paulo. It was collected from the Adamantina Formation of the Bauru Basin, which dates to the Turonian and Santonian stages of the Late Cretaceous.

Etymology
Barreirosuchus was first named by Fabiano Vidoi Iori and Karina Lucia Garcia in 2012 and the type species is Barreirosuchus franciscoi. The generic name is derived from the name of the rural district of Barreiro, where the holotype was found, and Greek souchus meaning "crocodile". The specific name honors the paleontologist Cledinei Aparecido Francisco from the Museu de Paleontologia de Monte de Alto, for technical support during the excavations of the holotype.

Description
The skull is somewhat deep as in other Cretaceous crocodyliforms, but is also very wide. It narrows toward the front, suggesting that the entire head was roughly triangular in shape. Some of the sutures between bones in the skull are fused, indicating that MPMA-04-0012/00 was an adult when it died. The preserved teeth are blunt and rounded.

Paleoenvironment
Barreirosuchus is thought to have been semiaquatic, much like modern crocodilians. Unlike the deep-skulled terrestrial crocodyliforms that lived alongside it, Barreirosuchus had a dorsoventrally flattened skull. Its eyes were angled upward and were positioned higher than most of the skull, allowing the animal to keep its eyes above the surface of the water if it were in a lake or river. The holotype specimen of Barreirosuchus was also found close to a turtle rib and an isolated crocodyliform tooth, evidence that its remains were preserved in an aquatic habitat. Remains of terrestrial crocodyliforms are abundant and well-preserved in the Bauru Basin, while fossils of aquatic and semiaquatic organisms are rarer and often disarticulated. Before the discovery of Barreirosuchus, the only known semiaquatic crocodyliforms from the Bauru Basin were Itasuchus jesuinoi and Goniopholis paulistanus, and both were known only from isolated bones. Iori and Garcia proposed that terrestrial crocodyliforms were better preserved because they were better suited to drought conditions, possibly borrowing when rainfall was low. If they died in burrows, their skeletons were more likely to be preserved intact. A semiaquatic animal like Barreirosuchus, in contrast, would die in an exposed location if the body of water it lived in dried up. Scavengers may then have disturbed the remains and scattered the bones.

References

Late Cretaceous crocodylomorphs of South America
Terrestrial crocodylomorphs
Fossil taxa described in 2012
Adamantina Formation
Prehistoric pseudosuchian genera